A distinction is made between Greek gardens, made in ancient Greece, and Hellenistic gardens, made under the influence of Greek culture in late classical times. Little is known about either.

Minoan gardens
Before the coming of Proto-Greeks into the Aegean, Minoan culture represented gardens, in the form of subtly tamed wild-seeming landscapes, shown in frescoes, notably in a stylised floral sacred landscape with some Egyptianising features represented in fragments of a Middle Minoan fresco at Amnisos, northeast of Knossos. to observe, "For all practical purposes there appear to have been no gardens of any sort in Greek city homes, beyond perhaps a few pots with plants." Aside from vegetable plots and orchards, Ridgway found some literary and a small amount of archaeological evidence for public, or semi-public gardens linked to sanctuaries. In fifth- and fourth-century Athens, some public places were planted with trees, as Plato directed in his Laws, "The fountains of water, whether of rivers or springs, shall be ornamented with plantings and buildings for beauty", though he does not offer details.
 

In 1936, the surroundings of the  Temple of Hephaestus at Athens were excavated to bare rock, in which rectangular planting pits were identified, which ran round three sides of the temple but not across its front and were lined up with the columns of the temple. In their bases were the shattered remains of flower pots in which layered stems had been rooted; however, associated coins show that the first of these plantings had been made not before the third century BC. By that time, in mainland Greece and Ionia, the influence of Achaemenid Persia was paramount in humanly-tended gardens, but in the previous century, of Alexander the Great, Plutarch observed that as a boy he would inquire of Persian visitors to his father's court in Macedon, about Persian roads and military organization, but never of the Hanging Gardens of Babylon; Herodotus, who probably visited Babylon in the mid-fifth century, does not mention the hanging gardens. Xenophon, under Achaemenid Persian influence, planted a grove upon his return to Athens.  The myth, set in Macedon, of Silenus discovered drunken by Midas can be dated to the Hellenistic period simply from its setting, a rose garden.

In Athens, the first private pleasure gardens appear in literary sources in the fourth century. The Academy had its site in an ancient grove of plane trees sacred to an obscure archaic hero, Akademos. Sacred groves were never actively planted, but simply existed from time immemorial and were "recognized" as sacred: they have no place in the history of gardens, save as a resort for contemplation and, at Plato's Academy, for intellectual discourse. By contrast, the olive trees in the Academy, watered by the river Cephissus, were planted, grown, it was said, from slips taken of the sacred olive at the Erechtheum. The temenos, or sacred ground, of the Academy was walled round, for ritual reasons, as pleasure gardens would be, for practical ones; within its precincts were buildings: small temples, shrines and tombs, in addition to that of the presiding hero. 

In 322 BC, Theophrastus, the father of botany, inherited Aristotle's garden, along with his scholars and his library; of the garden we know only that it had a walk, and that Theophrastus lectured there: it may have been in some respects a botanical garden with a scientific rather than recreational purpose. On his return to Athens in 306 BCE, the philosopher Epicurus founded The Garden, a school named for the garden he owned about halfway between the Stoa and the Academy that served as the school's meeting place; little is actually known of the ascetic philosopher's garden, though in cultural history it grew retrospectively in delight: of his garden at Geneva, Les Délices, Voltaire could exclaim, with more enthusiasm than history, "It is the palace of a philosopher with the gardens of Epicurus— it is a delicious retreat".  Gardens of Adonis, under Syrian influence, were simple plantings of herbal seedlings grown in saucers and pots, which, when they collapsed in the heat of summer, were the signal for mourning for Adonis among his female adherents: these were not gardens in any general sense.

Hellenistic gardens
Though Harpalus, Alexander's successor at Babylon, grew some Greek plants in the royal palace and walks, mainland Greece, mother of democracy and Western cultural traditions, was not the mother of European gardens: the great Hellenistic garden was that of the Ptolemaic dynasty in Alexandria, a grand, walled paradise landscape that included the famous Library of Alexandria, part of the Musaeum. Water-powered automata and water organs featured in Hellenistic gardens, playthings devised by technicians such as Hero of Alexandria, who, not incidentally, also devised machinery for the stage. In late classical times the peristyle form became dominant in grand private houses. This was a paved courtyard, which came to be outfitted with potted plants, a Persian and Egyptian idea, surrounded by a roofed colonnade. It was used for palaces and gymnasia.

Roman decorative gardening first appeared after Roman encounters with gardening traditions of the Hellenized East.

References

Further reading

 Birge, Darice Elizabeth (1982). Sacred Groves in the Ancient Greek World. PhD diss., Univ. of California at Berkeley.
 Bonnechere, Pierre. (2007). "The Place of the Sacred Grove (Alsos) in the Mantic Rituals of Greece: The Example of the Alsos of Trophonios at Lebadeia (Boeotia)." In Sacred Gardens and Landscapes: Ritual and Agency. Edited by Michel Conan, 17–41. Washington, DC: Dumbarton Oaks Research Library and Collection.
 Bowe, Patrick. (2010). "The Evolution of the Ancient Greek Garden." Studies in the History of Gardens and Designed Landscapes 30.3: 208–223.
 Calame, Claude. (2007). "Gardens of Love and Meadows of the Beyond: Ritual Encounters with the Gods and Poetical Performances in Ancient Greece." In Sacred Gardens and Landscapes: Ritual and Agency. Edited by Michel Conan, 43–54. Washington, DC: Dumbarton Oaks Research Library and Collection.
 Carroll-Spillecke, Maureen. (1992). "The Gardens of Greece from Homeric to Roman Times." Journal of Garden History 12.2: 84–101.
 Giesecke, Annette L. (2007). The Epic City: Urbanism, Utopia, and the Garden in Ancient Greece and Rome. Washington, DC: Center for Hellenic Studies, Trustees for Harvard Univ.
 Gleason, Kathryn L. (2013). A Cultural History of Gardens in Antiquity. London: Bloomsbury.
 Osborne, Robin. (1992). "Classical Greek Gardens: Between Farm and Paradise." In Garden History: Issues, Approaches, Methods. Edited by John Dixon Hunt, 373–391. Washington, DC: Dumbarton Oaks Research Library and Collection.
 Porter, Ray. (2000). "The Flora of the Theran Wall Paintings: Living Plants and Motifs—Sea Lily, Crocus, Iris and Ivy." In The Wall Paintings of Thera. Vol. 2. Edited by Susan Sherratt, 603–630. Athens, Greece: Thera Foundation.
 Shaw, Maria C. (1993). "The Minoan Garden." American Journal of Archaeology 97.4: 661–685.

External links

Gardens and landscapes in Classical Greece

G01
G01
Types of garden by country of origin
Gardens in Greece
Garden
Mycenaean Greece